Wednesday to Come is the first play in a trilogy by New Zealand playwright Renée. The second play in the trilogy is Pass It On, and the third is Jeannie Once. The play follows the women of a family during the Depression in New Zealand.

Background 
The first performance took place at Downstage Theatre in Wellington on 17 August 1984, directed by George Webby.

Characters 
 Granna – in her late seventies
 Mary – fifty-five
 Iris – thirty-four
 Cliff – fifteen
 Jeannie – thirteen
 Ted – thirty-six
 Molly – twenty-eight
 Dot – thirty-five

Synopsis 
The play is set in early spring of 1934. It takes place in Mary's family house, halfway between Palmerston North and Wellington. Domestic tasks such as ironing, washing, dishwashing and cooking take place during the play. Granna, Iris, Mary, Jeannie and Cliff are in the kitchen, waiting for Ted to come home. He arrives with a coffin, and it becomes apparent that Ben has killed himself while working at a labour camp in the Great Depression.

Productions 

Amateur productions include
 Marlborough Repertory Society at the Boathouse Theatre (Blenheim), March 1987, directed by Pam Logan
 Te Awamutu Little Theatre, in April/May 1987, directed by David Broadhurst
 Globe Theatre, Dunedin, in 1995, directed by Hilary Halba
 Riccarton Players in Christchurch, in 2005, director by Doug Clarke
 Hutt Repertory in 2012, directed by Doug Buchanan

Response 
Extracts from Wednesday to Come were included in A Country of Two Halves, and Whaddarya?, productions by Young and Hungry National Schools Tour, which appeared at BATS Theatre in Wellington and toured schools nationally in 2018, in July 2021 respectively.

References 

New Zealand plays
Plays about families